Dobje is a small settlement in the Municipality of Litija in central Slovenia. It is relatively remote. The area is part of the traditional region of Lower Carniola. It is now included with the rest of the municipality in the Central Sava Statistical Region.

History
Dobje was a hamlet of Ježevec until 1995, when it was made a separate settlement.

References

External links
Dobje on Geopedia

Populated places in the Municipality of Litija